is a retired Japanese kickboxer. A professional competitor between 2005 and 2014, Itabashi is the former RISE and Krush super featherweight champion.

Kickboxing career

RISE

Early career
Itabashi made his professional debut against Daisuke Urata at TRIAL LEAGUE.1 on March 20, 2005. He won the fight by unanimous decision, with scores of 28–27, 29–27 and 29–27. Itabashi faced Junichi Kato in the second TRIAL LEAGUE event, held on June 26, 2005. He was once again victorious by unanimous decision. Itabashi made his AJKF debut against Yasuhiro Hamashima at AJKF "Muay Thai Wave from YOKOHAMA 4" on July 31, 2005. He won the fight by unanimous decision.

Itabashi faced Masaya Takahashi at R.I.S.E. G-BAZOOKA TOURNAMENT '06 on March 26, 2006, in his RISE promotional debut. He won the fight by unanimous decision. After beating Ryoma by unanimous decision at R.I.S.E. XXV on April 29, 2006, Itabashi was booked to face Tomoaki Suehiro R.I.S.E. FLASH to CRUSH TOURNAMENT '06 on June 25, 2006, in the quarterfinal bout of the 2006 RISE super featherweight tournament. He lost the fight by a first-round technical knockout.

Following his first professional loss, Itabashi was booked to face KAWASAKI at R.I.S.E. XXXV on April 29, 2007. He won the fight by unanimous decision. After successfully rebounding from his loss, Itabashi participated faced Yusuke Sugawara in the quarterfinals of the one-day RISE super featherweight tournament. He won the fight by unanimous decision. Itabashi advanced to the semifinals, where he faced Tomoaki Suehiro. He lost the fight by a second-round technical knockout.

Itabashi faced Nagaoka R.I.S.E. -β- "L7" on October 28, 2007. He won the fight by unanimous decision. Itabashi was then booked to face Akihiro Kuroda at J-NETWORK "Let's Kick with J 1st" on February 29, 2008. The fight was ruled a draw by unanimous decision.

After amassing an 8–2–2 record, Itabashi would go on a four fight winning streak, before challenging for a title. Itabashi first beat Fire Hiroshi by majority decision at RISE 44 on March 30, 2008. He was then booked to face Yu Akiyama at RISE 46 on May 11, 2008, whom he beat by unanimous decision. Itabashi extended his winning streak to three straight fights at RISE 49 on August 30, 2008, with a third-round knockout of Tomoya Miyashita. Itabashi faced Tomoaki Suehiro at RISE 51 on November 30, 2008, in his final fight of the year. He won the bout by majority decision.

Super featherweight champion
Itabashi challenged the reigning RISE Super Featherweight titleholder Yuki at RISE 52 on January 31, 2009. He won the fight by unanimous decision, with scores of 49–44, 49–46 and 49–43.

Itabashi made his first RISE title defense against TURBΦ at RISE 57 on July 26, 2009. He won the fight by split decision. Two of the judges scored the fight 49–47 and 49–48 in his favor, while the third judge scored it 49–48 for TURBΦ.

Itabashi made his second RISE title defense against the 2006 RISE Dead Or Alive Tournament tournament winner Keiji Ozaki at RISE 60 on November 22, 2009. He won the fight by a second-round knockout, flooring Ozaki with a flurry of punches.

Itabashi fought in three non-title bouts, following his first two title defenses. He first lost to Masahiro Yamamoto by unanimous decision at RISE 63 on April 7, 2010, but successfully rebounded with decision victories against Kanongsuk Weerasakreck at RISE 68 on July 31, 2010 and Anuwat Kaewsamrit at KGS "RISE 71" on October 3, 2010.

Itabashi made his third RISE title defense against Kosuke Komiyama at RISE 74 on February 27, 2011. He lost the fight by split decision.

Itabashi faced Genki Yamamoto at REBELS.8 & IT’S SHOWTIME JAPAN countdown-1 on July 18, 2011, in Yamamoto's retirement fight. He won the bout by unanimous decision, after an extra round was fought. Itabashi next fought Masahiro Yamamoto for the vacant  It's Showtime World -61kg title at REBELS.9 & It's Showtime Japan 4 on October 23, 2011. He lost the fight by unanimous decision.

Krush
Itabashi made his Krush debut against Naoki Ishikawa at Krush 19 on June 8, 2012. He lost the fight by unanimous decision. He rebounded from this loss with a first-round technical knockout of Katsuya Goto at Krush.23 on October 8, 2012.

Itabashi challenged the reigning Krush Super Featherweight champion Hirotaka Urabe at Krush.30 on August 11, 2013. He won the fight by unanimous decision, after an extra round was fought.

Itabashi next fought in two non-title bouts. He first beat Edoardo Tocci by a first-round knockout at Krush.34 on November 10, 2013, which he followed up with a unanimous decision victory against Sho Ogawa at Krush.38 on February 14, 2014.

Itabashi made his first Krush super featherweight title defense against the former AJKF Lightweight champion Haruaki Otsuki at Krush 41 on May 11, 2014. He lost the fight by unanimous decision.

Itabashi faced Tihomir Mitev at REBELS 30 on September 28, 2014, in what was the final professional kickboxing bout of his career. He won his retirement fight by unanimous decision.

Titles and accomplishments
RISE
RISE Super Featherweight championship
Two successful title defenses
Krush
Krush Super Featherweight Championship

Professional kickboxing record

|-  style="background:#cfc;"
| 2014-09-28|| Win ||align=left| Tihomir Mitev || REBELS 30 || Tokyo, Japan ||  Decision (Unanimous)|| 3 || 3:00
|-  style="background:#fbb;"
| 2014-05-11|| Loss||align=left| Haruaki Otsuki || Krush 41 || Tokyo, Japan || Decision (Unanimous) || 3 || 3:00
|-
! style=background:white colspan=9 |
|-  style="background:#cfc;"
| 2014-02-14|| Win ||align=left| Sho Ogawa || Krush.38 || Tokyo, Japan || Decision (Unanimous)|| 3 || 3:00
|-  style="background:#cfc;"
| 2013-11-10|| Win ||align=left| Edoardo Tocci || Krush.34 || Tokyo, Japan ||  KO (3 Knockdowns)|| 1 || 2:28
|-  style="background:#cfc;"
| 2013-08-11|| Win ||align=left| Hirotaka Urabe || Krush.30 || Tokyo, Japan || Ext.R Decision (Unanimous)|| 4 || 3:00
|-
! style=background:white colspan=9 |
|-  style="background:#cfc;"
| 2012-10-08|| Win ||align=left| Katsuya Goto || Krush.23 || Tokyo, Japan || TKO (Punches)|| 1 || 1:54
|-  bgcolor="#fbb"
| 2012-06-08 || Loss ||align=left| Naoki Ishikawa || Krush 19 || Tokyo, Japan || Decision (unanimous) || 3 || 3:00
|-  bgcolor="#fbb"
| 2011-10-23 || Loss||align=left| Masahiro Yamamoto || REBELS.9 & It's Showtime Japan 4 || Tokyo, Japan || Decision (unanimous) || 3 || 3:00 
|-
! style=background:white colspan=9 |
|-  bgcolor="#cfc"
| 2011-07-18 || Win ||align=left| Genki Yamamoto || REBELS.8 & IT’S SHOWTIME JAPAN countdown-1 || Tokyo, Japan || Ext.R Decision (Unanimous) || 4 || 3:00
|-  style="background:#fbb;"
| 2011-02-27 || Loss|| align=left| Kosuke Komiyama || RISE 74 || Tokyo, Japan || Decision (Split) || 5 || 3:00
|-
! style=background:white colspan=9 |
|-  bgcolor="#cfc"
| 2010-10-03 || Win ||align=left| Anuwat Kaewsamrit || KGS "RISE 71"  || Bunkyō, Tokyo, Japan || Ext.R Decision (Unanimous) || 4 || 3:00
|-  bgcolor="#cfc"
| 2010-07-31 || Win ||align=left| Kanongsuk Weerasakreck || RISE 68  || Tokyo, Japan || Decision (Unanimous) || 3 || 3:00
|-  bgcolor="#fbb"
| 2010-04-07 || Loss ||align=left| Masahiro Yamamoto || RISE 63 || Tokyo, Japan || Ext.R Decision (unanimous) || 4 || 3:00
|-  bgcolor="#cfc"
| 2009-11-22 || Win ||align=left| Keiji Ozaki ||RISE 60 || Bunkyo, Tokyo, Japan || KO (Punches) || 2 || 2:29 
|-
! style=background:white colspan=9 |
|-  bgcolor="#cfc"
| 2009-07-26 || Win ||align=left| TURBΦ	 || RISE 57  || Tokyo, Japan || Decision (Split) || 5 || 3:00
|-
! style=background:white colspan=9 |
|-  bgcolor="#cfc"
| 2009-05-31 || Win ||align=left| Jun Kaito || RISE 55  || Tokyo, Japan || Decision (Unanimous) || 3 || 3:00
|-  bgcolor="#cfc"
| 2009-01-31 || Win ||align=left| Yuki || RISE 52 || Japan || Decision (Unanimous) || 5 || 3:00
|-
! style=background:white colspan=9 |
|-  bgcolor="#cfc"
| 2008-11-30 || Win ||align=left| Tomoaki Suehiro || RISE 51  || Tokyo, Japan || Decision (Majority) || 3 || 3:00
|-  bgcolor="#cfc"
| 2008-08-30 || Win ||align=left| Tomoya Miyashita || RISE 49 〜RISING ROOKIES CUP〜  || Tokyo, Japan || KO (Punches) || 3 || 1:38
|-  bgcolor="#cfc"
| 2008-05-11|| Win ||align=left| Yu Akiyama || RISE 46 〜THE KING OF GLADIATORs '08〜 || Tokyo, Japan || Decision (Unanimous) || 3 || 3:00
|-  bgcolor="#cfc"
| 2008-03-30|| Win ||align=left| Fire Hiroshi || RISE 44 || Tokyo, Japan || Decision (Majority) || 3 || 3:00
|-  bgcolor="#c5d2ea"
| 2008-02-29|| Draw||align=left| Akihiro Kuroda || J-NETWORK "Let's Kick with J 1st" || Tokyo, Japan || Decision (Unanimous) || 3 || 3:00
|-  bgcolor="#cfc"
| 2007-10-28|| Win ||align=left| Nagaoka || R.I.S.E. -β- "L7" || Tokyo, Japan || Decision (Unanimous) || 3 || 3:00
|-  bgcolor="#fbb"
| 2007-06-17|| Loss ||align=left| Tomoaki Suehiro || R.I.S.E. FLASH to CRUSH TOURNAMENT '07, Semi Final || Tokyo, Japan || TKO (2 Knockdowns/Knees) || 2 || 1:38
|-  bgcolor="#cfc"
| 2007-06-17|| Win ||align=left| Yusuke Sugawara || R.I.S.E. FLASH to CRUSH TOURNAMENT '07, Quarter Final || Tokyo, Japan || Decision (Unanimous) || 3 || 3:00
|-  bgcolor="#cfc"
| 2007-04-29|| Win ||align=left| KAWASAKI || R.I.S.E. XXXV || Tokyo, Japan || Decision (Unanimous) || 3 || 3:00
|-  bgcolor="#fbb"
| 2006-06-25|| Loss ||align=left| Tomoaki Suehiro || R.I.S.E. FLASH to CRUSH TOURNAMENT '06, Quarter Final || Tokyo, Japan || TKO (2 Knockdowns/Right Hook) || 1 || 0:46
|-  bgcolor="#cfc"
| 2006-04-29|| Win ||align=left| Ryoma || R.I.S.E. XXV || Tokyo, Japan || Decision (Unanimous) || 3 || 3:00
|-  bgcolor="#cfc"
| 2006-03-26|| Win ||align=left| Masaya Takahashi || R.I.S.E. G-BAZOOKA TOURNAMENT '06 || Tokyo, Japan || Decision (Unanimous) || 3 || 3:00
|-  bgcolor="#c5d2ea"
| 2005-07-31|| Draw||align=left| Yasuhiro Hamashima || AJKF "Muay Thai Wave from YOKOHAMA 4" || Yokohama, Japan || Decision (Unanimous) || 3 || 3:00
|-  bgcolor="#cfc"
| 2005-06-26|| Win ||align=left| Junichi Kato || TRIAL LEAGUE.2 || Japan || Decision (Unanimous) || 3 || 3:00
|-  bgcolor="#cfc"
| 2005-04|| Win ||align=left| Daisuke Urata || || Japan || KO  ||  ||
|-  bgcolor="#cfc"
| 2005-03-20|| Win ||align=left| Daisuke Urata || TRIAL LEAGUE.1 || Japan || Decision (Unanimous) || 3 || 3:00
|-
| colspan=9 | Legend:

See also
 List of male kickboxers

References

Living people
1982 births
Japanese male kickboxers
Sportspeople from Fukushima Prefecture